Campan is a commune in the Hautes-Pyrénées department in the Occitanie region of south-western France.

Geography 
Campan stands in a valley of the same name at the confluence of the rivers Adour and Adour de Payolle. It is situated on the former Route nationale 618, the Route of the Pyrenees.

Campan includes:

 The town, seat of the Mairie (town hall)
 Galade
 Ste Marie de Campan, famous for its role in the Tour de France cycle race
 La Séoube and its valley, which leads to the col d'Aspin
 Payolle
 Gripp et Artigues at the floor of the col du Tourmalet

The ski resort of La Mongie lies in Campan.

Administration 
The Mayor of Campan is Gérard Ara, whose term of office expires in 2014. Campan is unusual among French communes in having two electoral colleges for municipal elections: the township on one hand, and Sainte-Marie La Séoube on the other.

Demography

Economy 

The main economic activities are forestry, green marble quarrying, farming for wool and milk, and tourism.

Places of interest

Religious heritage 

 The church of Saint-Jean-Baptiste in Campan: it was constructed in the sixteenth century and contains a baroque altarpiece dating from the eighteenth century, from the school of the Ferrère brothers of Asté.
 The church Notre-Dame-de-l'Assomption in Sainte-Marie-de-Campan.
 The church Saint-Vincent-de-Paul in La Séoube.

The war memorial 
Sculpted by the artist Edmond Chrètien of Bordeaux, and erected in 1926 at the front of the church, to the right of the south door, the monument to the dead of Campan is distinguished by its sober and touching appearance.

Unlike the heroic soldiers who decorate many of the war memorials in France, the statue that dominates this monument represents a meditating woman, her face practically invisible, who wears the traditional clothing of the people of the valley. The memorial pays homage to the dead of the wars of the twentieth century from each of the sections of the commune: Le Bourg, Sainte Marie and La Séoube.

Finally, some bas-reliefs evoke 'peace rediscovered' through representations of the three main goods of the commune: wood, butter and wool.

Les Mounaques of Campan 
In the old days, when a man of the Campan valley got married in circumstances that were not normal, e.g., an old widower marrying a young girl, he was the object of a 'charivari' (i.e., pandemonium), an outbreak of very rough mockery. The couple was represented by coarse dolls, known as 'les Mounaques' (from the Occitan word 'monaca', meaning doll or puppet).

For some years, a workshop has been open in Campan manufacturing a collection of small 'mounaques'. Founded by Maryse Bouyrie and Marie-Madeleine Ortéga, initially situated at La Séoube, it has been located since 1999 at the heart of Campan, in a house provided by the municipal council, « la Clairefontaine ». In summer, displays of 'mounaques' can sometimes be seen around the town.

The Forge of Ste Marie de Campan 
This is one of the high places of the Tour de France. The famous cyclist, Eugène Christophe, known as 'le Vieux Gaulois' (the Old Gaul), repaired the front forks of his bicycle there after they broke during the descent of the Tourmalet in the 1913 race. The rules of the race prevented him from obtaining assistance and he had to walk 15 km to do the repairs himself. This gave the leading pack an advance of four hours and Christophe's dreams of victory evaporated. A plaque recalls the event.

Payolle 
The plateau of Payolle and its picturesque lake provide a place of recreation in both summer and winter. There one can ski, follow country paths by foot or on snowshoes, ride horses, fish and even go karting down hillsides.

The Cagots of Campan 

Like many towns in the Pyrenees, Campan was home to a population of Cagots, socially ostracised craftspeople, who until the beginning of the 20th century were forced to live on the right bank of the Adour separate from Campan proper. Records of the Cagots in Campan go back for more than eight centuries.

Around 1580, the Cagots had built a chapel, Saint-Sébastien, at a place called , near the bridge. In 1597, a fire damaged the church of Campan and the Cagots rebuilt the framework. On 19 November 1694 another violent fire destroyed the church, the hall and 70 houses. Classified as a historical monument since 14 March 1927, the hall is the oldest in the Hautes-Pyrénées.

But the Cagots remained, like all Cagots, separated from the rest of the inhabitants: in the church of Saint-Jean-Baptiste, built by the Cagots, a chapel at the bottom of the nave was separated from the rest of the church, it corresponds to the space that was the Cagots were forced to stay in. This space contains a stoup reserved for Cagots, located on the right side of the old entrance porch, on the west side of the church opposite the round stoup intended for the non-Cagot population.

See also 
 Col du Tourmalet
 Pic du Midi de Bigorre
 Communes of the Hautes-Pyrénées department

References 

Communes of Hautes-Pyrénées